The Pennsylvania Railroad's class H8, H9s and H10s steam locomotives were of the 2-8-0 "Consolidation" type, the last three classes of such built by the railroad.  The three classes differed only in cylinder diameter and thus tractive effort, each subsequent class increasing that measurement by an inch.  The first H8 was built in 1907 and the last H10 in 1916; within a few years they were replaced on heavy freight assignments by 2-8-2s and 2-10-0. They became the railroad's standard light freight locomotive, replacing all other class H 2-8-0s, and a number remained in service until the end of PRR steam locomotive operation in 1957.  968 class H8 of various subclasses were constructed, along with 274 class H9s and 273 class H10s.  A number of H8 locomotives were rebuilt to H9s specification.

Class H10s was built primarily for PRR Lines West, and featured a typical Lines West tender with sloping side coal boards at the top, to enable a bigger load of coal to be carried.

Some locomotives of this type were leased to the PRR-owned Long Island Rail Road, becoming the primary freight-hauling type on that system.

Survivors
7688, an H10s built in 1915 by the Lima Locomotive Works, has been preserved by the Railroad Museum of Pennsylvania.  It joins two earlier examples of the H class at the museum.  #7688 was added to the National Register of Historic Places in 1979 as Consolidation Freight Locomotive No. 7688.

References

 
{ http://broadway.pennsyrr.com/Rail/Prr/Rosters/steam_class.html }

Further reading

ALCO locomotives
Baldwin locomotives
Lima locomotives
2-8-0 locomotives
Steam locomotives of the United States
H8
Transportation in Lancaster County, Pennsylvania
Railway locomotives introduced in 1915
Railway locomotives on the National Register of Historic Places in Pennsylvania
Freight locomotives
Standard gauge locomotives of the United States
National Register of Historic Places in Lancaster County, Pennsylvania